Tīrau is a small town in the Waikato region of the North Island of New Zealand, 50 kilometres southeast of Hamilton. The town has a population of 804 (2018 census). In the Māori language, "Tīrau" means "place of many cabbage trees."

Tīrau is a major junction in the New Zealand state highway network. Just south of the township is the intersection of State Highway 1 and State Highway 5, where traffic from Auckland and Hamilton on State Highway 1 split to go either to Rotorua on SH 5, or continue along SH 1 to Taupō and beyond to Napier, Palmerston North and Wellington. State Highway 27 splits off State Highway 1 in the north of the town, providing a route north to the Coromandel Peninsula and an alternative route to Auckland, bypassing Hamilton.

Tīrau is primarily a farming town but in recent years has begun to exploit the income that comes from being at a major road junction.

The small community of Okoroire (with hot springs) is located just north of Tīrau.

History and culture

European settlement
In the 19th century, Tīrau, then known as Oxford, was originally planned as a township. However plans were changed after the entrepreneurial Rose family bought up large areas of land in the region, with the intention of making large returns when it came of high demand. Oxford later became a rural service town.

Oxford Royal Hotel opened on 15 April 1881. A store followed in June, but by September 1881 Oxford still only had the hotel and store. 94 lots in the township, which it had been planned to sell in 1891, were offered for sale in 1882. In the 1886 census, Oxford had a population of 48 in the 1896 census, 27 in 1891 and 127 in 1911.

Name
Oxford was a name given to the proposed township when it was sold by McLean & Co in 1881. It may have been to identify it as a sister town to Cambridge. Oxford changed its name to Tirau on 23 May 1896. To avoid confusion with Oxford in Canterbury, Piako County Council had been asked for a new name. They chose Tirau, which is the name of the hill to the south. The name was spelled without a macron until 2019, when the New Zealand Geographic Board made Tīrau the official name.

Railway station
Oxford railway station was at the site where the Kinleith Branch crossed Okoroire Rd The Thames Valley & Rotorua Railway Co. opened it on Monday 8 March 1886. Oxford was the terminus for a few months until 21 June 1886, when the line was extended south to Putāruru and Lichfield. On 3 days a week, from the start of the train service, a coach ran to Ohinemutu, at Rotorua.

New Zealand Railways Department took over the line on 1 April 1886. By August there was a coal shed (23ft x 15ft, 50 tons capacity), 2 cottages,  by   goods shed, turntable and a stationmaster's house. In 1895 the stationmaster was moved to Putāruru and Tirau was downgraded to a flag station. However, by 1896 Tīrau also had a 4th class station, platform, cart approach, loading bank, cattle yards, 4-stall engine shed, urinals and a passing loop for 26 wagons (extended for 70 wagons in 1964). In 1898 it was recommended that the engine shed be moved to Grahamstown, though a double shed was then built there. By 1911 there were also sheep yards.

563 passengers bought tickets in 1894, 330 in 1895 and 308 in 1896, when the main import was coal and the main exports timber and sheep. It was renamed Tirau on 8 March 1886.

In 1963 a new station in dark Huntly brick, with a storeroom, office, waiting room and platform for two railcars was built for about £4,800. Closure to passengers was on 12 November 1968 and to goods, except private siding traffic, on 29 March 1981. In 1989 the station was derelict, but still had a low level platform.

The main remnant of the station, alongside Prospect Avenue, is an NZHPT Category II listed (on 5 September 1985, List Number 4230) brick water tower. Opening of the station was delayed a week as the water supply wasn't complete. Similar towers remain at Lichfield and Ngātira. Fonterra still moves freight by rail from its Tīrau factory, which runs a very large anaerobic digester.

Recent history
In 1991, local business man Henry Clothier took advantage of the town's relatively cheap real estate and high traffic volume by opening an Antique shop in the former Rose Bros. grocery store building. Many other businesses followed suit off the back of his success throughout the 1990s until today. Tīrau has built a reputation as a shopping destination for antiques, collectibles and other niche items.

In 2005/06 the South Waikato District Council is working, on behalf of the Tīrau Ward, in conjunction with the community, to develop a concept plan for Tīrau's future. This project is taking the success of Tīrau's transformation over the past decade and linking it with the requirements of the Local Government Act 2002 new emphasis on the four well-beings, social, economic, environmental and cultural.

Marae

The local Paparāmu Marae and Te Apunga meeting house are affiliated with the Ngāti Raukawa hapū of Ngāti Mōtai and Ngāti Te Apunga.

Demographics
The settlement is part of the larger Tīrau statistical area.

Tīrau had a population of 804 at the 2018 New Zealand census, an increase of 102 people (14.5%) since the 2013 census, and an increase of 63 people (8.5%) since the 2006 census. There were 333 households, comprising 399 males and 402 females, giving a sex ratio of 0.99 males per female, with 156 people (19.4%) aged under 15 years, 150 (18.7%) aged 15 to 29, 351 (43.7%) aged 30 to 64, and 153 (19.0%) aged 65 or older.

Ethnicities were 81.0% European/Pākehā, 27.6% Māori, 1.5% Pacific peoples, 3.0% Asian, and 1.1% other ethnicities. People may identify with more than one ethnicity.

Although some people chose not to answer the census's question about religious affiliation, 56.7% had no religion, 29.9% were Christian, 1.5% had Māori religious beliefs, 1.1% were Buddhist and 1.9% had other religions.

Of those at least 15 years old, 66 (10.2%) people had a bachelor's or higher degree, and 186 (28.7%) people had no formal qualifications. 81 people (12.5%) earned over $70,000 compared to 17.2% nationally. The employment status of those at least 15 was that 333 (51.4%) people were employed full-time, 87 (13.4%) were part-time, and 27 (4.2%) were unemployed.

Tīrau statistical area

Tirau had a population of 2,334 at the 2018 New Zealand census, an increase of 228 people (10.8%) since the 2013 census, and an increase of 138 people (6.3%) since the 2006 census. There were 870 households, comprising 1,173 males and 1,161 females, giving a sex ratio of 1.01 males per female. The median age was 36.7 years (compared with 37.4 years nationally), with 552 people (23.7%) aged under 15 years, 417 (17.9%) aged 15 to 29, 1,047 (44.9%) aged 30 to 64, and 321 (13.8%) aged 65 or older.

Ethnicities were 87.4% European/Pākehā, 19.8% Māori, 1.4% Pacific peoples, 2.8% Asian, and 1.0% other ethnicities. People may identify with more than one ethnicity.

The percentage of people born overseas was 13.9, compared with 27.1% nationally.

Although some people chose not to answer the census's question about religious affiliation, 56.7% had no religion, 33.2% were Christian, 0.9% had Māori religious beliefs, 0.1% were Muslim, 0.3% were Buddhist and 1.7% had other religions.

Of those at least 15 years old, 234 (13.1%) people had a bachelor's or higher degree, and 408 (22.9%) people had no formal qualifications. The median income was $36,800, compared with $31,800 nationally. 336 people (18.9%) earned over $70,000 compared to 17.2% nationally. The employment status of those at least 15 was that 1,005 (56.4%) people were employed full-time, 282 (15.8%) were part-time, and 48 (2.7%) were unemployed.

Tourism

The town is now a well known tourist stop-off, and is characterised by many art works created out of corrugated iron. The church and many of the shops feature corrugated iron sculptures by local artist Steven Clothier and two large buildings are completely made from this material; the information centre which is shaped like a giant dog, and the neighbouring sheep and ram building - earning Tīrau the title of "Corrugated Capital of the World".

The Castle, a large toy museum on the town's southern limits which opened in 2000, can clearly be seen when heading towards the township from Rotorua or Taupō. The Tīrau dairy factory is New Zealand's only producer of lactalbumin, a key ingredient in the production of sports supplements.

Government
Tīrau is governed locally by the South Waikato District Council. Nationally, Tīrau is part of the  general electorate and the  Māori electorate.

Transport
The Royal Hotel ran coaches twice a week from Cambridge from 1882. By 1924 AARD was running a regular bus between Hamilton and Rotorua, via Tīrau. In 2018 47% of those in the Tīrau statistical area said they drove to work, 30% worked from home, 4% walked and 0.5% cycled. An Urban Connector bus runs twice a day between Tokoroa and Tīrau, via Putāruru and Lichfield. Tīrau is also served by InterCity buses to Auckland, Gisborne, Hastings and Wellington.

Education
Tirau Primary School is the sole school in Tīrau. It is a contributing primary school (Years 1–6) and has  students as of 

See also
Okoroire

Notes

References

External links

 Tīrau's official website
1958 aerial photo

Populated places in Waikato
South Waikato District